= Julie Goodnight =

- Education: California State University, Northridge
- Occupations: Horse trainer and clinician
- Employer: Self
- Known for: Horsemanship and teaching
- Spouse: Rich Moorhead
- Children: Hunter Goodnight
- Website: Julie Goodnight

Julie Goodnight is a horse trainer and clinician.

Julie Goodnight is a multidisciplinary rider and clinician, with experience in dressage, jumping, racing, reining, colt-starting, cutting, and wilderness riding. She teaches other riders through her Clinic Tour and through her television show Horse Master With Julie Goodnight. She also does clinics at expos and has many DVDs for horse training and riding. Goodnight travels the world teaching natural horsemanship, emphasizing doing what is best for the horse, and also the rider's safety.

She was influenced by ex-Cavalry instructors who were multidisciplinary riders.
